Mola di Bari is a railway station in the Italian town of Mola di Bari, in the Province of Bari, Apulia. The station lies on the Adriatic Railway (Ancona–Lecce). The train services are operated by Trenitalia.

Train services
The station is served by the following service(s):

Regional services (Treno regionale) Foggia-Bari - Monopoli - Brindisi - Lecce

See also
Railway stations in Italy
List of railway stations in Apulia
Rail transport in Italy
History of rail transport in Italy

External links

This article is based upon a translation of the Italian language version as at May 2014.

Railway stations in Apulia
Railway stations opened in 1865
Buildings and structures in the Province of Bari